This is a list of avant-garde and experimental films released in the 2020s.

References 

2020's
Avant-garde